Muhsin Parari is an Indian film director, writer and lyricist, who works in Malayalam films.

Career

He started his career by directing the music album Native Bapa (2012), in which actor Mamukkoya played the lead. He worked as assistant director in feature films 5 Sundarikal (2013) and Last Supper (2014). His first movie as a director was KL 10 Patthu (2015). In 2016, He returned with Funeral of a Native Son, a sequel to Native Bappa. Muhsin co-wrote the movie Sudani from Nigeria with director Zakariya Mohammed in 2018. The movie received five Kerala State Film Awards including the one for Best Screenplay. His next release was Virus, directed by Aashiq Abu. The movie was set against the backdrop of the 2018 Nipah virus outbreak in Kerala. Muhsin co-wrote the screenplay with the duo Suhas-Sharfu. His 2020 release was Halal Love Story, second feature by Zakariya Mohammed after Sudani from Nigeria. Zakariya and Muhsin again joined to write the script and also credited as co-producers of the movie.

Muhsin is the writer and creative director of 2022 movie Thallumaala (dir:Khalid Rahman). The movie was announced in 2019 as his second directorial venture, but later in February 2020, Muhsin Parari announced that he would do the script part only, and Khalid Rahman would be the director. The movie was big commercial success and turned out to be ninth-highest grossing Malayalam film.

He is also a lyricist, and has penned songs in movies such as Thamaasha, Halal Love Story, Bheemante Vazhi and Thallumaala.

Filmography

Movies

Other works

Ad films
 Tales of love - Madhyamam Kudumbam
 Entri App

As lyricist 
Muhsin has earlier penned lyrics for Music Albums Native Bappa and Funeral of a Native Son, directed by himself. His film debut as a lyricist was through 2019 movie Thamaasha, directed by his friend Ashraf Hamza. Muhsin was asked to complete the lines of Paadi Njan, an incomplete Mappilappaattu written by Pulikkottil Hyder into a full-length song. He also wrote three other songs for Thamaasha. Later in the year he wrote Malayalam lines for Spread Love, a promotional track for the movie Virus along with English lyrics provided by Shelton Pinheiro. In 2020, he wrote Chayappaattu, an installment in Sithara Krishnakumar's Project Malabaricus and two songs for the movie Halal Love Story. He has won Best Lyricist award at 10th South Indian International Movie Awards for penning Sundaranayavane from Halal Love Story.  In 2021, He joined again with Ashraf Hamza by penning all songs on Hamza's second film Bheemante Vazhi.

He wrote all the songs in 2022 movie Thallumaala, directed by Khalid Rahman and written by himself.

Muhsin often prefer a pen name "Mu. Ri" for songwriting credits.

Awards

References

External links
 
 

Malayalam film directors
1988 births
Malayali people
Film directors from Kerala
Living people
People from Malappuram district